John Vaillant (born June 4, 1962) is an American-Canadian writer and journalist whose work has appeared in The New Yorker, The Atlantic, National Geographic, and Outside. He has written both non-fiction and fiction books.

Personal life
Vaillant was born in Cambridge, Massachusetts and has lived in Vancouver since 1998.
He is the son of Harvard psychologist George Eman Vaillant, and grandson to the famed anthropologist George Clapp Vaillant.

Writing career
His first book, The Golden Spruce, dealt with the felling of the Golden Spruce or Kiidk'yaas on Haida Gwaii by Grant Hadwin.

His 2010 work, The Tiger: A True Story of Vengeance and Survival is about a man-eating tiger incident that happened in the 1990s in Russia's Far Eastern Primorsky Krai, where most of the world's Amur tigers live. It is a mixture of investigative journalism, social history, geography and natural writing. It won a number of awards and was selected for the 2012 edition of CBC Radio's Canada Reads, defended by lawyer and television personality Anne-France Goldwater.

His next book was The Jaguar's Children (2015), a novel about an undocumented Mexican immigrant trapped inside the empty tank of a water truck that has been abandoned in the desert by human smugglers. The novel was a shortlisted nominee for the 2015 Rogers Writers' Trust Fiction Prize. The Jaguar's Children received positive reviews from the New York Times and NPR.

Writing style
Vaillant is known for focusing on environmental issues - such as trees in the northwest, nearly-extinct tigers, and GMO corn in Mexico - and mixing that with stories about crime or violence.

Awards and honors
2005 Governor General's Award, The Golden Spruce
2005 Writers' Trust Non-Fiction Prize, The Golden Spruce
2010 British Columbia's National Award for Canadian Non-Fiction, The Tiger
2010 The Globe and Mail Best Book for Science 2010, The Tiger
2012 Nicolas Bouvier Prize in Saint Malo, France, The Tiger (French translation)
2014 Windham–Campbell Literature Prize in Nonfiction, achievement award valued at $150,000 the largest of its kind.

Bibliography
Vaillant is the author of three books:

References

External links
 

Canadian non-fiction writers
Writers from Cambridge, Massachusetts
Writers from Vancouver
Living people
Governor General's Award-winning non-fiction writers
21st-century Canadian novelists
Canadian male novelists
21st-century Canadian male writers
Canadian male non-fiction writers
1962 births